Joyeeta Foundation is a Bangladesh government foundation under the Ministry of Women and Children Affairs that provides financing and support to women entrepreneurs.

History
Joyeeta Foundation was established in November 2011 under the Societies Registration Act, XXI of 1860. It provides a low interest loans to women entrepreneurs.

References

2011 establishments in Bangladesh
Organisations based in Dhaka
Research institutes in Bangladesh